The  superyacht Lunasea was launched at the Feadship yard at the Kaag Island in 2017 named Hasna. She was delivered to her first owner, John Symond, later that year. Hasna was listed for sale for the first time in 2019 and reported to be sold in 2020 to American businessman Yahn Bernier. Subsequently, her name was changed to Lunasea.

Design 
British designer Redman Whiteley Dixon, designed both the interior and exterior of Lunasea. The hull is built out of steel while the superstructure is made out of aluminium with teak laid decks. The yacht is classed by Lloyd's registered and flagged in the Cayman Islands.

Engines 
She is powered by twin 1,850 hp MTU 12V4000 M53 engines.

See also
 List of motor yachts by length
 List of yachts built by Feadship

References

2017 ships
Motor yachts
Ships built in the Netherlands